Gonatista is a genus of praying mantises in the family Epaphroditidae.

The following species are recognised in the genus Gonatista:

Gonatista grisea
Gonatista jaiba
Gonatista major
Gonatista phryganoides
Gonatista reticulata
According to a 2004 paper by entomologists from the University of Catania and the National Museum of Natural History this  genus:
...is widely distributed in North America and the Caribbean area. There are (five) homogeneous species...whose specific differences such as chromatic models and body size, as shown in literature (Caudell 1912), do not help us in their identification. On the basis of the material studied here we have verified that a valid diagnostic character is the morphology of the external copulatory apparatus

See also
List of mantis genera and species

References

Mantodea genera
Epaphroditidae
Mantodea of North America